Aksay may refer to:
Aksay, West Kazakhstan Province, a town in Kazakhstan
Aksay, Issyk Kul, a village in Kyrgyzstan
Aksay, Rostov Oblast, a town in Russia

See also
 Aksai (disambiguation)
 Aksay, Russia, a list of places in Russia